Prattsville may refer to: 

 Prattsville, New York, a town in Greene County
 Prattsville (CDP), New York, a hamlet in the town
 Prattsville, Arkansas, a town in Grant County

See also
 Prattville (disambiguation)